The York Football League is a football competition based in North Yorkshire, England, founded in 1897. Currently it is known under the terms of a sponsorship agreement as the York Minster Engineering Football League. It is a member of the North Riding County Football Association, and the Premier Division sits at level 11 in the English football pyramid.

The most successful York clubs in history in terms of championships won are Dringhouses, York Railway Institute, Osbaldwick and Rowntrees. Three teams which now compete at higher levels in the English football system once competed in the York Football League: Pickering Town, Tadcaster Albion and Knaresborough Town.

History
When the league was formed in the late 1800s, association football was just beginning to gather popularity in England. The Football League itself had only begun nine years before the York League; it was also founded prior to the city's now primary team York City. Upon the league's formation, nine teams entered into the league, the founding clubs were:

Throughout the league's history, the only club from the first-ever season to continue in an unbroken existence is Rowntrees (now known as Nestlé Rowntree) until its demise at the start of the 2013–14 season.

However, Bishopthorpe United, Easingwold Town and St. Clements are at present still playing in the York League system, after refounding at various points.

Acomb and Rowntrees (along with fellow league team York YMCA) also went on to become founding members of the Yorkshire League for the 1920–21 season.

Some teams from the York League have climbed the football ladder in the past. Pickering Town played in the league before gaining promotion in 1972. They are currently in the Northern Counties East Premier Division. Also, York Railway Institute and Rowntrees were crowned champions of the Northern Counties East League Division One during the 1980s.

Recent times
Today it has a total of four divisions (and three reserve divisions) including the York League Premier Division which sits at level 11 of the English football league system. The league title has been regularly changing with no team retaining it since 2007–08 when Huntington Rovers achieved it. A number of teams that have recently joined the league have progressed successfully though the divisions to the Premier Division (Tadcaster Magnets, F1 Racing and Sporting Knavesmire).

New teams entering for the 2017–18 season are Clifford, Elm Bank, Stillington and Wistow.

Former professional footballers with York City played in the league, including Andy McMillan and Christian Fox at Haxby United.

The Representative team entered the 2017/18 FA Inter League Cup, reaching the final after wins over West Riding County Amateur league, Chester and the Wirral league, Staffordshire County League and Kent County League.

Member clubs 2022-23

Premier Division
Dringhouses
Dunnington
Easingwold Town AFC
Huntington Rovers
Kirkbymoorside
Malt Shovel (Selby)
Old Malton St Mary's
Osbaldwick
Poppleton United
Rawcliffe
Tadcaster Magnets
Thorpe United
Wigginton Grasshoppers

Division One
Bishopthorpe White Rose | Cawood | Duncombe Park | Haxby Town | Hemingbrough United | Pocklington Town 2nd | Pollington | Rufforth United | Strensall Tigers | Tockwith AFC

Division Two
Bubwith White Swan | Civil Service (York) | Cliffe | Clifford | Garforth LG | Helperby United | Heslington | Howden AFC | Stamford Bridge AFC | Walnut Tree | Wheldrake

Division Three
Church Fenton | Copmanthorpe | Ebor Wanderers | Elvington Harriers | Fulford | Hamilton Panthers | South Milford | Sporting Knavesmire | Wilberfoss AFC | York St John University YSJ (Sat)

Division Four
Barmby Moor | Bishop Wilton | Hensall Hawks Open Age | Knottingley Albion Junior York League | London NE Railway Builders | Marton Abbey | Selby Olympia | The Beagle | York Railway Institute | York Shamrocks

Champions

Premier Division

Division One
Below is an incomplete list of previous champions at the second level of York League football. 
From 1923 until 1960 (with the exception of 1932–33, 1939–40 and 1946–47), this division was split into two groups, hence why for those years there are two champions.

1909–10 Tadcaster Albion
1910–11 Easingwold
1911–12 Lowther United
1912–13 Cawood United
1913–14 Acomb
1916–19 Suspended due to World War I
1919–20 Burton Lane Working Mens Club
1920–21 Fishergate Old Boys
1921–22 Archbishop Holgates Old Boys
1922–23 St Lawrences Working Mens Club
1923–24 St Lawrences Working Mens Club / Tadcaster Albion
1924–25 St Lawrences Working Mens Club / Selby Olympia
1925–26 Clarence C&I / Selby Olympia
1926–27 LNER Locomotive / South Bank Working Mens Club
1927–28 LNER Locomotive / Poppleton United
1928–29 LNER P'way / South Bank
1929–30 Selby East Common / Malton Bible Class
1930–31 Clarence C&I / RA & Signals
1931–32 Selby Brayton Road / Poppleton Road OB
1932–33 Tadcaster Albion]
1933–34 LNER Institute / 3rd Hussars
1934–35 Easingwold Town / Riccall United
1935–36 Market Weighton / Duncombe Park
1936–37 Fulford United / Old Malton St Mary's
1937–38 Fulford United / Acomb
1938–39 Old Priory / York Railway Institute
1939–40 Easingwold Town
1941–46 Suspended due to World War II
1946–47 New Earswick
1947–48 United Services / Poppleton Road Old Boys
1948–49 Fulford Road WMC / Market Weighton
1949–50 Fulford United / South Bank
1950–51 Cliftonville / Clifton & Rawcliffe Community Association
1951–52 Huntington Rovers / Catholic United
1952–53 BR Nomads / Knaresborough
1953–54 Pickering Town / Catholic United
1954–55 Riccall United / Haxby
1955–56 Duncombe Park / Ardua
1956–57 Olympia Mills (Selby) / South Bank
1957–58 Old Malton St. Mary's / Rowntrees
1958–59 Cawood / Dunnington
1959–60 Fulford United / Holme Rovers
1960–61 South Bank / Cookes
1961–62 Selby Shipyards / Civil Service
1962–63 Easingwold Town / NMU
1963–64 Olympia Mills (Selby) / British Sugar
1964–65 Huntington Rovers
1965–66 Fulford United
1966–67 NMU
1967–68 Vickers
1968–69 Wilberfoss Athletic
1969–70 Riccall United
1970–71 Old Malton St. Mary's
1971–72 Amotherby & Swinton
1972–73 New Earswick
1973–74 British Sugar
1974–75 Sheriff Hutton
1975–76 Pickering Town
1976–77 Rangers
1977–78 Melbourne
1978–79 Brayton
1979–80 Post Office
1980–81 York Railway Institute
1981–82 Huntington Rovers
1982–83 Dringhouses
1983–84 St John's College
1984–85 Cliftonville
1985–86 Huntington Rovers
1986–87 Griffin
1987–88 Olympia Mills
1988–89 Riccall United
1989–90 Westlers United
1990–91 New Earswick
1991–92 General Accident
1992–93 Wigginton Grasshoppers
1993–94 Boroughbridge
1994–95 New Earswick
1995–96 Rufforth United
1996–97 Pocklington SC
1997–98 General Accident
1998–99 York Sugar
1999–2000 Wigginton Grasshoppers
2000–01 Riccall United
2001–02 Malton Bacon Factory
2002–03 Wigginton Black Horse
2003–04 Thorpe United
2004–05 Nestlé Rowntree
2005–06 Heslington
2006–07 Haxby United
2007–08 Wilberfoss
2008–09 Riccall United
2009–10 York Railway Institute
2010–11 Wigginton Grasshoppers
2011–12 Terrington Glory
2012–13 Aviva
2013–14 Tadcaster Magnets
2014–15 F1 Racing
2015–16 Malton & Norton
2016–17 Poppleton United
2017–18 Thorpe United
2018–19 Pocklington Town 2nd

Division Two
Below is an incomplete list of previous champions at the third level of York League football. The most common structure for the league was where it was split into two groups at the same level, hence the reason for two champions in some seasons. At times there were even three groups under the same league at this level.

1909–10 Escrick Park
1910–11 Melbourne A S
1911–12 Clifton Church Institute
1912–13 Bishopthorpe
1913–14 South Bank
1914–19 Suspended due to World War I
1919–20 Central Mission
1920–21 Huntington
1921–22 Poppleton United
1922–23 Model School Old Boys
1923–24 Clarence C&I / LMS Railway
1924–25 Poppleton Road Old Boys / Fulford United
1925–26 Acomb AS / Church Fenton
1926–27 Acomb AS / Tadcaster United
1927–28 LNER P'way / RA Signals
1928–29 Huntington Rovers / St Georges Wesleyans
1929–30 Stamford Bridge
1930–31 Huntington Rovers / Poppleton Road Working Mens Club
1931–32 Acomb Carr Lane / Riccall United
1932–33 Stamford Bridge / St. Maurice's
1933–34 Heslington / Eborcraft
1934–35 Crescent Working Mens Club / RAOC
1935–36 Haxby Fellowship / Acomb
1936–37 Pocklington
1937–38 Clifton Colliery Institute
1938–39 Poppleton United / Cawood
1939–46 Suspended due to World War II
1946–47 Fulford Road WMC / Pocklington US
1947–48 Huntington Rovers / RAF Rufforth
1948–49 Cliftonville Youth Club / C&W Nomads / INL
1949–50 Clifton & Rawcliffe Community Association / South Bank / NMU
1950–51 Pavilion Rangers / Poppleton SF / Groves United
1951–52 Heslington / Knaresborough / Escrick Park
1952–53 Cookes / RAF Church Fenton / Gleneagles
1953–54 Fulford Road Working Mens Club / South Bank Reserves
1954–55 Duncombe Park / Crayke
1955–56 Wilberfoss Athletic / Haxby Reserves
1956–57 Cliftonville Reserves / Mail Coach United
1957–58 Yard Staff Reserves / LNER Builders
1958–59 Easingwold Town / Crayke
1959–60 Armstrong / Hammerton United
1960–61 Selby St. Mary's / NMU
1961–62 Heworth / Haxby Reserves
1962–63 Unicrux / Strensall
1963–64 Ampleforth / Escrick Brick & Tile Works  	
1964–65 Fulford United
1965–66 Newton-on-Ouse
1966–67 Wilberfoss Athletic
1967–68 Heworth
1968–69 Stillington
1969–70 Old Malton St. Mary's
1970–71 FC Melrose
1971–72 Post Office
1972–73 Pocklington Social Club
1973–74 Sheriff Hutton
1974–75 St John's College
1975–76 Moor Lane Youth Club
1976–77 Cawood
1977–78 Kingsway
1978–79 Water Lane Youth Club
1979–80 St John's College
1980–81 Chapelfields Youth Club
1981–82 Dringhouses
1982–83 Fulford United
1983–84 Olympia Mills (Selby)
1984–85 Selby Town Reserves
1985–86 Old Malton St Mary's
1986–87 Bishopthorpe United
1987–88 Westlers United
1988–89 Stamford Bridge
1989–90 General Accident
1990–91 Black a Moor
1991–92 Old Malton St Mary's
1992–93 York Sugar
1993–94 Fulford United
1994–95 Kartiers 
1995–96 Malton Bacon Factory
1996–97 Copmanthorpe
1997–98 York Sugar
1998–99 Thorpe United
1999–2000 South Bank
2000–01 Hammerton United
2001–02 Tate & Lyle Selby
2002–03 Hamilton Panthers
2003–04 Easingwold Town
2004–05 Heslington
2005–06 Poppleton United
2006–07 Osbaldwick
2007–08 York Railway Institute
2008–09 Hemingbrough United
2009–10 St. Clements
2010–11 Terrington Glory
2011–12 Church Fenton White Horse
2012–13 Tadcaster Magnets
2013–14 F1 Racing
2014–15 Sporting Knavesmire
2015–16 Thorpe United
2016–17 Wilberfoss
2017–18 Haxby Town
2018–19 Malt Shovel

Division Three
Below is an incomplete list of previous champions at the fourth level of York League football in all forms.

1920–21 Poppleton United
1921–22 Phoenix Working Mens Club
1922–23 Manor School Old Boys
1923–36 not competed
1936–37 Riccall United
1937–38 Church Fenton
1938–65 not competed
1965–66 Cross Keys
1966–67 Fulford Road Working Mens Club
1967–68 Bishop Wilton
1968–69 Amotherby & Swinton
1969–70 FC Melrose
1970–71 New Earswick
1971–72 Cravens
1972–73 Sheriff Hutton
1973–74 Crown Hotel
1974–75 Moor Lane Youth Club
1975–76 Cawood
1976–77 Kingsway
1977–78 Chapelfields Youth Club
1978–79 Osbaldwick
1979–80 Aruda
1980–81 Ebor
1981–82 Olympia Mills (Selby)
1982–83 Selby Town Reserves
1983–84 Hemingbrough United
1984–85 Melbourne
1985–86 Poppleton United
1986–87 Westlers United
1987–88 Rangers
1988–89 Black a Moor
1989–90 Ben Johnsons
1990–91 Selby RSSC
1991–92 Post Office
1992–93 Whitemoor
1993–94 Kartiers
1994–95 Malton Bacon Factory
1995–96 Cawood
1996–97 Hamilton Panthers
1997–98 Thorpe United
1998–99 Stillington
1999–2000 Hammerton United
2000–01 Tate & Lyle Selby
2001–02 LNER Builders
2002–03 Wilberfoss
2003–04 Tockwith
2004–05 Sheriff Hutton
2005–06 Huby United
2006–07 St. Clements
2007–08 Heworth
2008–09 Terrington Glory
2009–10 Strensall
2010–11 Cliffe
2011–12 Tadcaster Magnets
2012–13 F1 Racing
2013–14 Sporting Knavesmire
2014–15 Kirkbymoorside
2015–16 Wilberfoss
2016–17 Heworth Green
2017–18 Malt Shovel
2018–19 Wheldrake

References

External links
York League (Current)
York League (Old)
York Minster Engineering League @ TheFA.com
York Press – Football News

 
Football leagues in England
Football in North Yorkshire
1897 establishments in England
Sports leagues established in 1897
Football competitions in Yorkshire